Kotelnikov is a rural locality (a khutor) in Kotelnikovskoye Rural Settlement, Kotelnikovsky District, Volgograd Oblast, Russia. The population was 748 as of 2010. There are 16 streets.

Geography 
Kotelnikov is located on the banks of the Aksay Kurmoyarsky, 5 km east of Kotelnikovo (the district's administrative centre) by road. Kotelnikovo is the nearest rural locality.

References 

Rural localities in Kotelnikovsky District